Prince Ferdinand Georg August of Saxe-Coburg and Gotha (28 March 1785 – 27 August 1851) was a German prince of the House of Saxe-Coburg and Gotha and a general of cavalry in the Austrian Imperial and Royal Army during the Napoleonic Wars. Initially remaining a Lutheran until 1818, by marriage he established the Catholic branch of the family, which eventually gained the thrones of Portugal (1837) and Bulgaria (1887).

Birth and family
Ferdinand was born at Coburg as Prince Ferdinand Georg August of Saxe-Coburg-Saalfeld, the second son of Francis Frederick Anthony, Duke of Saxe-Coburg-Saalfeld and his second wife, Countess Augusta Caroline Sophie Reuss of Ebersdorf. In 1826 his title changed from Prince of Saxe-Coburg-Saalfeld to Prince of Saxe-Coburg and Gotha, when his brother Duke Ernst I made a territorial exchange with other members of the family.

Ferdinand's nephews and nieces included Queen Victoria of the United Kingdom and her husband Prince Albert, as well as Empress Carlota of Mexico and her brother King Leopold II of Belgium.

Military career

French Revolutionary Wars 
On 10 December 1791 Ferdinand was commissioned as Unterleutnant in the Dragoon-Regiment Coburg Nr. 6. He was promoted to Oberleutnant on 1 March 1796 and to Second-Rittmeister on 18 November 1798.

Napoleonic Wars 
On 1 February 1802 he transferred to the Austrian Army serving in the Chevauxleger-Regiment Fürst Rosenberg in which he was promoted to Major on 29 September 1804. On 1 January 1805 he transferred to the Husaren-Regiment Graf Blankenstein Nr. 6 in which he was promoted to Oberstleutnant on 6 August 1805.

War of the Fifth Coalition 
On 15 September 1808 Ferdinand became Oberst in the Husaren-Regiment Erzherzog Ferdinand d'Este Nr. 3.  It was in this regiment that he served in the War of the Fifth Coalition under Field Marshal Prince Hohenzollern.  He received the knight's cross of the Military Order of Maria Theresa.  Before the Battle of Wagram, he was named General of the Kavallerie Fürst Liechtenstein. On 15 April 1811 he was named Generalmajor.

War of the Sixth Coalition 
During the War of the Sixth Coalition, Ferdinand fought at the battles of Kulm and Leipzig.

Concert of Europe 
On 8 May 1822 Ferdinand became Inhaber (proprietor) of the k.u.k. Shortly thereafter, he was promoted to the rank of General der Kavallerie.

Marriage and children
In Vienna on 30 November 1815, Ferdinand married Princess Maria Antonia Koháry de Csábrág et Szitnya, daughter and heiress of Ferenc József, Fürst Koháry de Csábrág et Szitnya, converting to Roman Catholicism in 1818. When Antonia's father died in 1826, she inherited his estates in Hungary, and Ferdinand took the title of Duke of Saxe-Coburg and Gotha-Koháry.

Ferdinand and Antonia had four children, all of whom were raised Catholic:
Ferdinand II of Portugal (29 October 1816 – 15 December 1885), married Queen Maria II of Portugal on 9 April 1836. They had eleven children. He remarried Elisa Hensler on 10 June 1869. 
Prince August of Saxe-Coburg and Gotha (13 June 1818 – 26 July 1881), married Princess Clémentine of Orléans on 21 April 1843. They had five children, including king Ferdinand I of Bulgaria (their youngest child).
Princess Victoria of Saxe-Coburg and Gotha (14 February 1822 – 10 December 1857), married Prince Louis, Duke of Nemours on 27 April 1840. They had four children.
Prince Leopold of Saxe-Coburg and Gotha (31 January 1824 – 20 May 1884), married morganatically Constanze Geiger on 23 April 1861. They had one son.

Death
Ferdinand died at Vienna on 27 August 1851 at the age of 66.

Honours and awards
He received the following awards:

Ancestry

Bibliography
 Biographisches Lexikon des Kaisertums Österreich, II, 392-394.

References

Princes of Saxe-Coburg and Gotha
House of Saxe-Coburg-Gotha-Koháry
People from Coburg
Austrian people of German descent
1785 births
1851 deaths
Austrian Empire commanders of the Napoleonic Wars
Burials at the Ducal Family Mausoleum, Glockenburg Cemetery, Coburg
German Lutherans
Commanders Cross of the Military Order of Maria Theresa
Honorary Knights Grand Cross of the Order of the Bath
Grand Crosses of the Order of Christ (Portugal)
Grand Croix of the Légion d'honneur
Recipients of the Order of St. George of the Fourth Degree
Sons of monarchs